The 2018–19 UCLA Bruins women's basketball team represented the University of California, Los Angeles during the 2018–19 NCAA Division I women's basketball season. The Bruins, led by eighth year head coach Cori Close, played their home games at the Pauley Pavilion. They were members of the Pac-12 Conference.

The Bruins started the season 3–5, their worst start since the 2014–15 season, before going on a 6-game winning streak. The Bruins then lost their next four, including a 72–67 home loss on January 20 to a USC team that had failed to win any of its first five conference games. The loss dropped the Bruins to 0–3 in Pac-12 home games on the season; in the previous three seasons, they had only lost one Pac-12 home game.

The Bruins' next game following the USC loss was an upset road win over No. 16 Arizona State. The Bruins then traveled to Arizona and defeated the Wildcats 98–93 in three overtimes; the game was the first three-overtime game in UCLA women's basketball history, as well as the longest Pac-12 women's basketball game in over a decade.

On February 10, 2019, the Bruins upset No. 17 Utah, 100–90, in Salt Lake City. The Bruins' 40 points in the fourth quarter was the highest single-quarter point tally in UCLA women's basketball history.

On February 22, 2019, the Bruins upset No. 2 Oregon, 74–69, in Eugene. This was the Bruins' first win over a top five opponent since 2013. The Bruins erased a 22-point deficit in the comeback victory.

The Bruins finished the regular season with a 19–11 overall record and a 12–6 record in Pac-12 play (5–4 at home and 7–2 on the road), having won 10 of their last 12 regular season games. UCLA's only two losses during that 12-game span were against No. 10 Stanford at home and No. 12 Oregon State on the road.

On March 6, 2019, Pac-12 media members voted head coach Cori Close Pac-12 Coach of the Year.

The Bruins secured a (4) seed and a first-round bye to the Pac-12 Tournament. They defeated (5) Arizona State in the quarterfinals before losing to (1) Oregon in overtime in the semifinals.

The Bruins secured a (6) seed in the NCAA Women’s Tournament. They defeated (11) Tennessee 89–77 in the first round and defeated (3) Maryland 85–80 in the second round before losing to (2) Connecticut 69–61 in the Sweet Sixteen. The Bruins concluded the season with a 22–13 overall record. They won 13 of their last 17 games after starting the season 9–9.

Offseason

Departures

Incoming transfer

2018 recruiting class

Source:

Roster

Schedule

|-
!colspan=9 style=| Exhibition

|-
!colspan=9 style=| Non-conference regular season

|-
!colspan=9 style=| Pac-12 regular season

|-
!colspan=9 style=| Pac-12 Women's tournament

|-
!colspan=9 style=| NCAA Women's tournament

Rankings
2018–19 NCAA Division I women's basketball rankings

^Coaches did not release a Week 2 poll.

Honors
 March 5, 2019 – Michaela Onyenwere was named All-Pac-12 team, Kennedy Burke was named All-Pac-12 Honorable Mention and All-Defensive team, Lindsey Corsaro named to the All-Freshman team
 March 6, 2019 – Coach Cori Close was named the Pac-12 media Coach of the Year
 March 10, 2019 – Kennedy Burke and Japreece Dean were named to the Pac-12 All-Tournament Team

See also
2018–19 UCLA Bruins men's basketball team

Notes
 March 3, 2019 – The Bruins earned a four seed in the Pac-12 Tournament and play on Friday, March 8's quarterfinals at 11:30 a.m. (PT)

References

UCLA
UCLA Bruins women's basketball
UCLA Bruins basketball, women
UCLA Bruins basketball, women
UCLA Bruins basketball, women
UCLA Bruins basketball, women
UCLA